Margaret Gibson (June 4, 1948 – February 25, 2006) was a Canadian novelist and short story writer who lived in Toronto, Ontario.

Early life
Born and raised in the Toronto suburb of Scarborough, the middle child of Audrey and Dane Gibson, Margaret Gibson began writing in the early 1970s to document her struggle with mental illness. Initially diagnosed with paranoid schizophrenia, she learned only during her divorce from her first husband that she had been misdiagnosed and was in fact bipolar.

Gibson was married in the early 1970s to Stuart Gilboord, with whom she had one son, Aaron. Following her divorce from Gilboord, Gibson moved in with her longtime friend, actor and drag performer Craig Russell.

Gibson and Gilboord's custody battle for Aaron was portrayed in the 1994 television film For the Love of Aaron, in which Gibson was portrayed by actress Meredith Baxter.

Writing career
Gibson published The Butterfly Ward, her debut short story collection, in 1976. The book included the story "Making It", based on her experiences living with Russell, which was later made into the feature film Outrageous! by director Richard Benner. Hollis McLaren played Liza Conners, the fictionalized version of Gibson, in that film. Benner also wrote and directed the sequel Too Outrageous! 10 years later.

"Ada", another story in the collection, was the basis of a CBC Television movie directed by Claude Jutra for the drama anthology series For the Record. It was Jutra's first English-language film production.

The Butterfly Ward was a winner of the City of Toronto Book Award in 1977, shared with Margaret Atwood's novel Lady Oracle.

Gibson's other short story collections include Considering Her Condition (1978), Sweet Poison (1993) and The Fear Room and Other Stories (1996).

She published releasing her first and only novel Opium Dreams in 1997. Opium Dreams was a winner of the Books in Canada First Novel Award, and Gibson published her final short story collection Desert Thirst in 1998.

Later years
In later years, Gibson lived with Juris Rasa, her second husband. She died in 2006 of breast cancer at age 57.

Works about Margaret Gibson
Her friend Stephen Jon Postal and his wife Guia Dino Postal chronicled Gibson's teenage life in the novel Of Margaret and Madness: A Novel Inspired by True Events.

In 2011, Vassar College's Powerhouse Theater produced David Solomon's play Margaret and Craig in workshop. The play was based on the writing of Craig Russell and Margaret Gibson.

Bibliography
The Butterfly Ward, 1976
Considering Her Condition, 1978
Sweet Poison,1993
The Fear Room and Other Stories, 1996
Opium Dreams, 1997
Desert Thirst, 1998

References

External links

1948 births
2006 deaths
Canadian women novelists
Canadian women short story writers
Writers from Scarborough, Toronto
Deaths from cancer in Ontario
Deaths from breast cancer
People with bipolar disorder
20th-century Canadian novelists
20th-century Canadian women writers
20th-century Canadian short story writers
Amazon.ca First Novel Award winners